Events in the year 1980 in Turkey.

Parliament
 16th Parliament of Turkey (up to 12 September)

Incumbents
President –
 Fahri Korutürk (up to 6 April)
İhsan Sabri Çağlayangil (acting, 6 April – 12 September)
Kenan Evren (from 12 September)
Prime Minister –
 Süleyman Demirel (up to 12 September)
Bülent Ulusu (from 20 September)
Leader of the opposition –
Bülent Ecevit (up to 12 September)

Ruling party and the main opposition
  Ruling party 
 Justice Party (AP) (up to 12 September)
  Main opposition 
 Republican People's Party (CHP) (up to 12 September)

Cabinet
43rd government of Turkey (up to 12 September)
44th government of Turkey (from 21 September)

Events

January 
 2 January – Military leaders issue a warning letter about terrorism.

February 
 2 February – DİSK initiates a general strike.

April 
 18 April – Turkey signs a nuclear nonproliferation accord.

May 
 25 May – Trabzonspor wins the championship

July 
 1 July – Turkey signs an association agreement with the European Community.
 19 July – Former Premier Nihat Erim killed by terrorists.

August 
 5 August – Hazal by Ali Özgentürk wins the Grand Prix in France.
 6 August – Armenian terrorists attack the Turkish Consulate in Lyon.

September 
 12 September – 1980 Turkish coup d'état.

October 
 11 October – Census (Population: 44,736,947)
 15 October – NSP chairman Erbakan and 21 party members arrested for acting against secular principles of the republic.
 27 October – Work begins on a new constitution.
 30 October – Bülent Ecevit resigns from CHP for its passivity during the coup.

Births
4 February – Gündüz Gürol Azer, footballer
12 April – Arda Kural, actor
16 June – Nehir Erdoğan, actress
29 September – Ümit Şamiloğlu, artistic gymnast
14 October – Cansu Dere, actress

Deaths
11 April – Ümit Kaftancıoğlu (born 1935), TV producer (assassinated)
18 May – Gündüz Kılıç (born 1918), football coach
21 June – Feridun Cemal Erkin (born 1899), diplomat and politician
19 July – Nihat Erim (born 1912), former prime minister (33rd and 34th government of Turkey, assassinated)
22 July – Kemal Türkler (born 1926), trade union leader (assassinated)
27 June – Ahmet Muhip Dıranas (born 1909), poet and author
30 November – Orhan Eyüpoğlu (born 1918), politician

Gallery

See also
Turkey in the Eurovision Song Contest 1980
1979–80 1.Lig

References

 
Years of the 20th century in Turkey